Death is the irreversible cessation of all biological functions that sustain an organism.

Death, deceased or died may also refer to:

Personification
 Angel of Death (disambiguation)
 Death (personification), or the Grim Reaper, various depictions of Death as a sentient being

Places
 Death Valley, valley in the U.S. state of California
 Highway of Death, road in Kuwait and Iraq
 El Camino de la Muerte, road in Bolivia

People

 Jason Death (born 1971), Australian rugby league footballer
 Steve Death (19492003), English football goalkeeper

Arts, entertainment, and media

Comics
 Master Death, a Yugoslav comic strip

Fictional entities

Characters
 Death (Castlevania), also referred to as the Grim Reaper, a fictional character in the Castlevania video game series
 Death (DC Comics), a fictional character in the comic book series The Sandman
 Death (Discworld), a fictional character in Terry Pratchett's Discworld series
 Death (Marvel Comics), a fictional character in comic books published by Marvel
 Death, a fictional video game character from Malice
 Death, depicted in the television show  Family Guy
 Death, a high level monster from the game Perfect World
 Death Larson, fictional character, brother of Wolf Larson in Jack London's 1904 novel The Sea-Wolf
 Lord Peter Death Bredon Wimsey (occasional alias Death Bredon), fictional detective in novels by Dorothy Sayers

Places
 Death (place), the underworld, a place of death where departed spirits go awaiting judgment
 Isle of the Dead (disambiguation)
 Death, a fictional location in the Old Kingdom by Garth Nix
 Death Star, a fictional mobile space station and galactic superweapon in the Star Wars science-fiction franchise

Literature
 Death: Chuck Schuldiner's lyrics, 2000 book about the death metal band, Death
 Death (play), a play by Woody Allen
 A Death, 2015 short story by Stephen King
Death: An Essay on Finitude, book by Françoise Dastur

Music
 Death metal, heavy metal subgenre

Groups
 Death (metal band), American death metal band from Altamonte Springs, Florida
 Death (proto-punk band), American punk/proto rock from Detroit, Michigan

Albums and songs
 Death (album), by Teitanblood
 Death (EP), by Thy Serpent
 "Death" (Melanie Martinez song), 2023
 "Death" (Trippie Redd song), 2019
 "Death" (White Lies song), 2008
 "Death", the original title for the song "Fiction" by Avenged Sevenfold, from Nightmare, 2010
 "Death", a song by C418 from Minecraft – Volume Alpha, 2011
 "Death", a song by Judas Priest from Nostradamus, 2008
 "Death", a song by Skinny Puppy from The Process, 1996
 "Death", a song by Devin Townsend from Physicist, 2000
 "Died" (song), by Alice in Chains

Statues and sculptures
 Death (statue) by Isamu Noguchi

Television
 "Death" (South Park), season 1, episode 6 of South Park
 "Death", episode 50 of Fullmetal Alchemist

Other uses
 Death (cigarette), a brand of cigarettes introduced in the United Kingdom in 1991 by The Enlightened Tobacco Company
 Death (tarot card), a Major Arcana tarot card
 Brain death, complete and irreversible cessation of brain activity
 Second death, an eschatological concept in Judaism and Christianity

See also 
 Cult of the dead (disambiguation)
 De'Ath
 Dead (disambiguation)
 Death spiral (disambiguation)
 Deceased (band), a death/thrash band from Arlington, Virginia that has attained a dedicated cult following
 Dr. Death (disambiguation)
 Lists of deaths by year
 Lists of people by cause of death
 Near-death (disambiguation)
 Sudden death (disambiguation)
 The Dead (disambiguation) 
 Wall of death (disambiguation)